Bow, McLachlan and Company was a Scottish marine engineering and shipbuilding company that traded between 1872 and 1932.

History

1872–1914

In 1872 William Bow and John McLachlan founded the company at Abbotsinch, Renfrewshire, where it made steering gear and light marine steam engines. In 1900 the company expanded into the building of small ships by taking over J. McArthur & Co's Thistle Works and shipyard at Paisley, also in Renfrewshire. The expanded undertaking became a limited liability company at the same time.

Bow, McLachlan & Co. entered the specialist market for "knock down" vessels. These were bolted together at the shipyard, all the parts marked with numbers, disassembled into many hundreds of parts and transported in kit form for final reassembly with rivets. This elaborate method of construction was used to provide inland shipping for export, or for lakes that had no navigable link with the open sea.

The company also built barges, river steamers and small cargo ships. Ships built in 1904 included the sail and steam-powered cutter  for HM Coast Guard and the  steam yacht  for Lord Pender.

First World War

Also in 1919 it built several Moor class mooring vessels for the Admiralty.

1920–32
In 1920 the company went into voluntary liquidation but was reconstituted as a new company with the same name. Also in 1920 the company built the steam yacht  for its co-founder William Bow. In the 1920s Bow, Maclachlan supplied export orders from countries including Australia, Greece, India and Portugal. At the beginning of the 1930s the company supplied export orders including a class of six tugs for the Chilean Navy.

In 1930 Bow, McLachlan built the motor yacht  for Lord Strathcona and Mount Royal. However, by then manufacturing in the UK was declining in the Great Depression so the UK Government sponsored a rationalisation of the shipbuilding industry. In 1932 National Shipbuilders Securities took over and closed down Bow, McLachlan.

In the Second World War the yard was reopened briefly to build landing craft.

Surviving ships

Several Bow, MacLachlan ships survive around the World. The veteran cargo ship Nyanza and cargo and passenger ship Rusinga on Lake Victoria were reported to have survived into the 21st century, now trading in private ownership. One UK Admiralty Moor class mooring vessel, HMDYC Moorstone, continues in civilian service as the Turkish-registered Çıkaran. The paddle steamer  (1921) was restored in 2001 and continues in tourist service on the River Nile. The pilot boat  (1927) is preserved in Sydney, New South Wales. The tug  is preserved in Punta Arenas, Chile and the paddle tug  (also 1931) is preserved at Chatham Historic Dockyard, England.

References

Defunct shipbuilding companies of Scotland
Engineering companies of Scotland
.
Companies based in Paisley, Renfrewshire
British companies established in 1872
Manufacturing companies established in 1872
Manufacturing companies disestablished in 1932
1872 establishments in Scotland
1932 disestablishments in Scotland
History of Renfrewshire
1932 mergers and acquisitions
British companies disestablished in 1932